is a Japanese chemist and Professor of Chemistry, Nihon University, as well as Professor Emeriti of the Institute for Molecular Science in Okazaki, the University of Tokyo, and Kyushu University in Japan.

Education
 1957 B.S. Faculty of Science, The University of Tokyo
 1962 D.Sci. in Chemistry, The University of Tokyo
Thesis: Intramolecular Hydrogen Bonding between Hydroxy Group and π-Electron Systems (Supervisors: Professors Yoshiyuki Urushibara and Michinori Oki)

Academic experience
1962-1966 Assistant Professor, The University of Tokyo
1966-1969 Lecturer, The University of Tokyo
1967-1969 Research Associate, University of Wisconsin (with Prof Howard E. Zimmerman)
1970-1977 Associate Professor, The University of Tokyo
November 1974-January 1975 DAAD Visiting Professor, University of Tübingen, Germany
1977-1988 Professor, Institute for Molecular Science, 1978-1987 Director of Division of Applied Molecular Science
1983-1985 Adjunct Professor, Faculty of Engineering, Nagoya University
1987-1995 Professor, The University of Tokyo
November, 1987 Visiting Professor, University of Chicago
1994-1998 Professor, Kyushu University, 1995-1998 Director, Institute for Fundamental Research in Organic Chemistry, Kyushu University
April–May, 1995 Visiting Professor, Louis Pasteur University, France
1998-2000 Professor, National Institution for Academic Degrees
2000-2005 Professor, University of the Air, 2001-2005 Director of Tokyo Bunkyo Study Center
2005-2010 Professor, Advanced Research Institute of Science and Humanity, Nihon University
2010–present Professor, College of Science and Technology, Nihon University

Professional activities
1979-1989 Associate and Titular Member, Commission on Organic Photochemistry, Division of Organic Chemistry, IUPAC 
1992-1994 Member of the Board of Directors of the Chemical Society of Japan
1993-1994 Chairman, Kanto Section of the Chemical Society of Japan
1999-2012 Chairperson of the Committee for Validation and Examination for Degrees, National Institution for Academic Degrees and University Evaluation
2000-2005 Member of the Science Council of Japan
2005-2011 Corresponding Member of the Science Council of Japan
March 2000-February 2001 President Elect, the Chemical Society of Japan
March 2001-February 2002 President, The Chemical Society of Japan
2007-2008 The First President, Japan Union of Chemical Science and Technology

Journals involvement
1987-1996 Journal of Physical Organic Chemistry Editorial Board
1987-1992 New Journal of Chemistry, France, Advisory Board
1987-1999 Advances in Physical Organic Chemistry, Advisory Board
1988-2000 Chemical Reviews (American Chemical Society), Editorial Advisory Board

Chairmanship of conferences and symposia
June 1982 Oji International Seminar on Chemistry of Weak Molecular Interactions in Aichi
October 1992 International Conference on Chemistry and Physics of Molecule-Based Magnetic Materials in Tokyo
1990-1995 The Chemical Society of Japan Executive Committee for 1995-Chemical Congress of The Pacific Basin Societies in Honolulu
1995 The 6th Kyushu International Symposium on Physical Organic Chemistry
1995-2000 Vice-Chairman, 2000 Chemical Congress of the Pacific Basin Societies in Honolulu
September 1996 The 1st Gordon Research Conference on Organic Structure and Properties in Fukuoka

Awards and honors
1963 The Chemical Society of Japan Award for Young Scientist　
November 1987 Julia and Edward Lee Lectureship from the University of Chicago
1992 The Chemical Society of Japan Award
1996 Purple Ribbon Medal of Japan (Shiju Hosho)
1998 Fujiwara Science Award
2001 Maria Sklodowska-Curie Medal from the Polish Chemical Society
2003 The Japan Academy Prize
2010 The Order of the Sacred Treasure

Major research interest and accomplishments
Organic molecule-based magnets, Radical and carbene chemistry, Correlated internal rotation (molecular gears), Organic reactions in sub- and supercritical water.
In 1984 he prepared hydrocarbon tri-carbene and tetra-carbene to demonstrate that their 2p-electron spins aligned in parallel and paramagnetic moments became greater than those of iron(III) and Gd(III) salts due to five 3d- and seven 4f-electron spins, respectively. The highest spin nona-carbene ever prepared had a S = 9 ground state (1993). Aminoxyl radicals and pyridylcarbenes were assembled into polymers by coordination with magnetic metal ions to give mixed metal-organic molecule-based magnets. They included a ferromagnet with the Curie temperature of 46 K (1996) and photomagnets where only the irradiated part become strongly magnetic (1997).
Earlier he designed and prepared a whole series of di-(9-triptycyl)X (X=CH2, NH, O, SiH2, S) as molecular cog-wheels and demonstrated that they undergo almost free correlated internal rotation (disrotation) by various physical and chemical measurements. Since the rapid internal rotation of the cog-wheels does not get off the track, the di-9-triptycyl compounds carrying different benzene ring(s) gave isolable stereoisomers due to the phase of the label in spite of the rapid internal rotation (1980).
More recently he developed a number of preparative organic reactions that proceed by way of aldol condensation and Michael addition in sub- or supercritical water in the absence of any added catalysts.

Selected bibliography
“Magnetic Behavior of Nonet Tetracarbene m-Phenylenebis[(diphenylmethylenen-3-yl)methylene]”, T. Sugawara, S. Bandow, K. Kimura, H. Iwamura, and K. Itoh, J. Am. Chem. Soc., 106 (1984) 6449-6450.
“High-spin organic molecules and spin alignment in organic molecular assemblies“, H. Iwamura, Adv. Phys. Org. Chem. 26 (1990) 179-253.
“A Branched-Chain Nonacarbene with a Nonadecet Ground State: A Step Nearer to Superparamagnetic Polycarbenes“, N. Nakamura, K. Inoue, and H. Iwamura, Angew. Chem., Inter. Ed. Engl., 32 (1993) 872-874.
“Studies of Organic Di-, Oligo-, and Polyradicals by Means of Their Bulk Magnetic Properties“, H. Iwamura and N. Koga, Acc. Chem. Res. 26, 346-351 (1993).
“Toward Dendritic Two-Dimensional Polycarbenes: Synthesis of "Starburst"-Type Nona- and Dodecadiazo Compound and Magnetic Study of Their Photoproduct”, K. Matsuda, N. Nakamura, K. Inoue, N. Koga, and H. Iwamura, Bull. Chem. Soc. Jpn. 69 (1996) 1483-1494.
“High-Spin Polynitroxide Radicals as Versatile Bridging Ligands for Transition Metal Complexes with High Ferri-/Ferromagnetic TC”, H. Iwamura, K. Inoue, and T. Hayamizu, Pure Appl. Chem. 68 (1996) 243-252. 
“Formation of Ferromagnetic Chains by Photolysis of 1:1 Complexes of Bis(hexafluoro-acetylacetonato)copper(II) with Diazodi(4-pyridyl)methane”, Y. Sano, M. Tanaka, N. Koga, K. Matsuda, H. Iwamura, P. Rabu, and M. Drillon, J. Am. Chem. Soc. 119 (1997) 8246-8252.
“Magnetic Ordering in Metal Coordination Complexes with Aminoxyl Radicals”, H. Iwamura and K. Inoue, in Magnetism; Molecules to Materials II. Molecule-Based Materials, J. Miller and M. Drillon, Eds.; Wiley-VCH: Weinheim, Germany; Chapt. 2 (2001) 61-108.
“Organic Synthetic and Supramolecular Approaches to Free Radical-based Magnets”, H. Iwamura, Proc. Japan Acad., 81, Ser. B (2005) 233-243.
“What role has organic chemistry played in the development of molecule-based magnets?” H. Iwamura, Polyhedron 66 (2013) 3–14.
“Unconventional Synthesis and Conformational Flexibility of Bis(1-triptycyl) Ether”, Y. Kawada and H. Iwamura, J. Org. Chem., 45 (1980) 2547-2548.
“Crystal and Molecular Structure of Bis(9-triptycyl) Ether”, H. Iwamura, T. Ito, H. Ito, K. Toriumi, Y. Kawada, E. Osawa, T. Fujiyoshi, and C. Jaime, J. Am. Chem. Soc. 106, (1984) 4712-4717.
“Stereochemical Consequences of Dynamic Gearing”, H. Iwamura and K. Mislow, Acc. Chem. Res., 21 (1988) 175-182.
“Organic Reactions in Sub- and Supercritical Water in the Absence of Any Added Catalyst”, H. Iwamura, T. Sato, M. Okada, K. Sue and T. Hiaki, J. Res. Inst. Sci. Tech., Nihon Univ., 132 (2014) 1–9.

External links 
 Prof. Emeritus Hiizu Iwamura awarded the Order of the Sacred Treasure, Gold Rays with Neck Ribbon
 ICMM 2O12 Olivier Kahn Lecture

References

Japanese chemists
Living people
Academic staff of the University of Tokyo
Academic staff of Nihon University
1934 births
Academic staff of Kyushu University
Recipients of the Medal with Purple Ribbon